() is a square-shaped mandu (dumpling) in Korean cuisine. It is a food typically served in summer, served chilled, and dipped in soy sauce and vinegar. The city of Gaeseong in North Hwanghae Province is famous for its pyeonsu.

Etymology 
The origin of the word  is obscure. It is also said that the name is Sino-Korean , as the dumplings are served floating on water.

History 
Although Korean mandu are believed to have first been brought to Korea by Yuan Mongolians in the 14th century during the Goryeo, the variety pyeonsu is thought to be derived from Ming Chinese dumplings brought into the Korean peninsula by the Joseon merchants based in Gaeseong.

During the Joseon era (1392–1897), wheat flour was a rare and expensive ingredient in most regions, except in Hwanghae Province, where wheat was very common. Many dumpling varieties in that period were made with buckwheat-flour, while in Gaeseong, where the wheat was abundant, dumpling skins were made with wheat flour. Wheat dumplings, called pyeonsu, were made with simple tofu and mung bean sprout stuffings in poorer households, while extravagant versions with beef and fresh oyster were made in wealthier households in Gaeseong. The 1809 compendium Women's Encyclopedia records that pyeonsu of Songdo (name of Gaeseong at the time) is famous and is made during the festivities around Korean New Year.

Unlike other dumpling varieties, pyeonsu was not popularized on a nationwide scale during the 20th century and remains a regional specialty usually served only in Gaeseong-style restaurants.

Preparation 
Wheat flour dough is made by mixing wheat flour with boiling water. The dough is then rolled thin and cut into squares to make pyeonsu. Common fillings include meat and vegetables such as beef, pork, chicken and pheasant meat, tofu, mung bean sprouts, mushrooms, oyster, and a couple of whole pine nuts per dumpling. The stuffings are seasoned with salt and black pepper, ground toasted sesame, sesame oil, and minced aromatic vegetables such as scallions, ginger, and garlic.

The dumplings are boiled in a beef and soy sauce based broth, chilled, and served as is or in cold chicken broth. Soy sauce mixed with vinegar is usually served as dipping sauce.

Sometimes, pyeonsu can be served as warm pyeonsu-guk (dumpling soup), with gomyeong (garnish) such as egg garnish and chopped scallions on top.

See also 
 Pyanse
 List of dumplings

References 

Dumplings
Korean cuisine
Kaesong